Attitude Adjuster is a studio album by the rapper Pastor Troy, released in 2008. Attitude Adjuster debuted at number 116 on the U.S. Billboard 200 chart, selling about 6,400 units its first week.

Critical reception
AllMusic wrote that the album "comes on strong with 'I’m Hot (I Got That Lava)' and doesn’t let up throughout with its barrage of thumping, head-nodding beats and tales of hardcore life delivered in Troy’s amped-up, aggro style."

Track listing

Chart performance

Samples
The fifth track, "For My Soldiers," samples the song "Shape of My Heart" by Sting. The third track, "Street Law," samples the song "Message in a Bottle" by The Police.

References

Pastor Troy albums
2008 albums
Real Talk Entertainment albums
Albums produced by Big Hollis